Dangerous Dan McFoo is a 1939 Warner Bros. Merrie Melodies cartoon directed by Tex Avery. The short was released on July 15, 1939.

The title is based on a 1907 poem by Robert W. Service entitled "The Shooting of Dan McGrew".

Plot
Dan, an anthropomorphic puppy, is in the rear of the arctic "Malibu Saloon" playing pinball.  A villain enters and sees Dan's love interest, Sue, and is instantly smitten with the Bette Davis lookalike; she tells the villain in the voice (and catchphrase) of Katharine Hepburn:  "I hope Dan mows you down, really I do."  A boxing match ensues, and Dan is able to dodge most of the villain's blows for most of round 1. In round 2, the villain gains the upper hand, knocking Dan unconscious. When Dan's ghost revives him with a bucket of water, Dan accuses the villain of cheating; four horseshoes – and a horse – are found in his boxing glove. In round 3, now with a blow-by-blow commentator and freeze-frame shot analysis, Dan goes on the offensive, but the fight remains evenly matched; the narrator then gives the combatants pistols to duel and finish the fight once and for all.  The lights go out, shots are fired and Sue screams ("Eek!").  When the lights come on, Dan is seen lying on the floor. His girlfriend says repeatedly, "Say something! Say something!" Dan McFoo wakes up and says "Hewwo!".

Home media
VHS – The Golden Age of Looney Tunes, Vol. 3: Tex Avery (unrestored)
Laserdisc – The Golden Age of Looney Tunes, Volume 1, Side 3 (unrestored)
DVD – Dodge City (USA 1995 dubbed print included as a bonus)
Blu-Ray – Dodge City (USA 1995 dubbed print included as a bonus)

Notes
Six years later, Avery would direct a similar cartoon for Metro-Goldwyn-Mayer called The Shooting of Dan McGoo. This short stars Droopy.
Arthur Q. Bryan voiced Dan McFoo, Mel Blanc voiced the Stranger, Sara Berner voiced Sue, Robert C. Bruce voiced the Narrator, the Referee, and the Dog with the Cigarette, and The Sportsmen Quartet voiced The Three Singing Dogs.
This cartoon was re-released into the Blue Ribbon Merrie Melodies program on January 30, 1948.
This cartoon is notable for being the first to be re-released in the Blue Ribbon Merrie Melodies program with custom letter font titles. Also, this cartoon is notable for first using the voice that would later be associated with the Looney Tunes character, Elmer Fudd.

References

External links

1939 films
Merrie Melodies short films
Warner Bros. Cartoons animated short films
1939 animated films
Films directed by Tex Avery
Films scored by Carl Stalling
Films based on works by Robert W. Service
Animated films about dogs
1930s Warner Bros. animated short films
1930s English-language films